Brosnan is a surname, derived from the Irish "Ó Brosnacháin," which may be derived from the place name Brosna in Kerry.
Notable people with the surname include:

Brian Brosnan, Irish boxer
Chris Brosnan (born 1972), British film director, writer, and producer
Cornelius M. Brosnan (1813–1867), Justice of the Supreme Court of Nevada
D. William Brosnan (1903–1985), American railroad executive
Eoin Brosnan, Irish Gaelic football player
Jim Brosnan (1929–2014), American baseball player
John Brosnan (1947–2005), Australian author
John Brosnan (soldier) (1846–1921), Irish soldier who fought in the American Civil War
Patrick Brosnan (born 1968), American mathematician
Pierce Brosnan (born 1953), Irish actor
Sarah Brosnan, American ethologist
Seán Brosnan (1916–1979), Irish barrister and politician
Steven Brosnan (born 1976), Australian rules footballer

References